Andrey Nikolayevich Belozersky (Андре́й Никола́евич Белозе́рский) (29 August, 1905 (Tashkent, Turkestan region, Russian Empire) – 31 December, 1972 (Moscow, Soviet Union)) was a Soviet

biologist and biochemist, one of pioneer of molecular biology studies in the Soviet Union. Andrey Nikolayevich was Academic of the Academy of Sciences of the Soviet Union from 1962 and vice president of it from May 28,1971 – December 31, 1972. He conducted research related with composition of nucleic acids and their distribution in different organisms. He also obtained the first evidence of mRNA existence and lay the foundations of genosystematics.

Biography

Childhood 
A. N. Belozersky was born in Tashkent, in a family of the official. His father, Nikolay Andreevich Belozersky, was born in the Russian family that migrated to Central Asia, and worked as a lawyer of the judicial chamber. His mother, Evgeniya Semenovna Lahtina, worked as a musician teacher in a gymnasium. There were three children in their family: Nikolay, Lidiya and Andrey. When parents died in 1913, Andrey was sent to the Gatchina orphanage but he was accepted into the family of his mother’s sister in 1917 when the orphanage was closed. Tatyana Semenovna Ivanova, sister of Andrey’s mother, lived in Verny town (now Alma-Ata).

Students years 
When Belozersky was 16 (in 1921) he was enrolled in the National University of Uzbekistan in the Faculty of Physics and Mathematics. At that time, Belozersky didn’t even have a secondary diploma. He was taught N. A. Dimo, A. L. Brodsky, P. A. Baranov, I. A.Raikova, A. I. Vvedensky and others. While studying, Belozersky was working as laboratory assistant (1923-1924) and since 1925 Belozersky had been teaching on Faculty of Labor in SAGA. Also, in this university under the guidance of A. V. Blagoveshchensky, he made his first research work – investigation of proton concentration in water extracts of some mountain plants’ leaves.

In 1927 A. N. Belozersky graduated from the Faculty of Physics and Mathematics with specialty “plant physiology”. From 1927 to 1930 he studied at the postgraduate school of the SAGA.

Work at Moscow University 
In 1930, Belozersky met Alexander Robert Kiesel during a trip to Moscow and was invited to work at the Department of Plant Biochemistry at Moscow University, which was being created at that time. Under the guidance of A. R. Kiesel, Belozersky began to study plant proteins at different stages of plant ontogenesis, in particular nucleoproteins, which are complexes of proteins with nucleic acids. 

Since 1930, A. N. Belozersky worked at the Department of Plant Biochemistry of Moscow State University. He started as an assistant (1930-1932), then became an associate professor (1932-1943) and finally a professor (1943-1972). In 1938 he was awarded the degree of candidate of sciences, and in 1943 he defended his dissertation for the degree of Doctor of Biological Sciences on the topic "Nucleoproteins and polynucleic acids of plants". 

In 1943, A. N. Belozersky was appointed professor of the Biological Faculty of Moscow State University. In 1960, he was appointed Head of the Department of Plant Biochemistry of Moscow State University (now the Department of Molecular Biology of the Faculty of Biology of Moscow State University). After the death of A. N. Belozersky, the department was headed by his student, academician A. S. Spirin. 

From 1951 to 1954, A. N. Belozersky was director of the Biology and Soil Research Institute, and in1954-1960 - Head of the Botanical Department of the Biology and Soil Faculty. 

In 1963, A. N. Belozersky became the head of the newly organized Department of Virology at the Biology and Soil Faculty, in 1965 - the newly created problematic interfaculty laboratory of Bioorganic Chemistry, which in 1991 became the A. N. Belozersky Research Institute of Physico—Chemical Biology. 

A. N. Belozersky was directly involved in the renovation and modernization of laboratories and participated in the creation of new places for practical classes. He improved the existing lecture courses for students of the Faculty of Biology and created new ones. He wrote a "Practical Guide to Plant Biochemistry" together with N.I. Proskuryakov. 

A. N. Belozersky was very fond of young people, closely following the educational and scientific activities of students. Belozersky created a large school of Russian biochemists (A. S. Spirin, A. S. Antonov, B. F. Vanyushin, I. B. Naumova, etc.). Under his leadership, a large number of people defended their PhD and doctoral dissertations, and a number of students became members of the Russian Academy of Sciences (RAS).

Other activity 
A. N. Belozersky founded a new laboratory of antibiotics (now the Laboratory of Biochemistry of Stress of Microorganisms) at the A. N. Bach Institute of Biochemistry of the USSR Academy of Sciences (1946), where he led until 1960. 

In 1947-1951 Andrey Nikolaevich worked at the N.F.Gamalei Institute of Epidemiology and Microbiology of the USSR Academy of Medical Sciences, where he carried out work related to the study of antigenic and immunogenic properties of E. coli nucleoproteins in association with V. D. Gekker. 

A. N. Belozersky has repeatedly participated in international congresses on biochemistry (Belgium, Austria), lectured at the University of Tirana (Albania), Peking University (China), Charles University (Czech Republic), Sofia University (Bulgaria). 

A. N. Belozersky conducted extensive scientific and editorial work. He has prepared a number of monographs and reviews for publication. He was the chief editor of the journal "Successes of Modern Biology" (1963-1972), editor of the journals "Biochemistry", "Cytology", "Bulletin of the USSR Academy of Sciences". 

A. N. Belozersky worked for a long time at the USSR Academy of Sciences. In 1963, he was elected Deputy Academician-Secretary of the Department of Biochemistry, Biophysics and Chemistry of Physiologically Active Compounds of the USSR Academy of Sciences, in 1970 — Academician-Secretary of the Department, in 1971 — Vice-President of the USSR Academy of Sciences and Chairman of the Section of Chemical-Technological and Biological Sciences of the Presidium of the USSR Academy of Sciences. He worked to promote fundamental scientific achievements for the needs of industry and agriculture. He was one of the organizers of the development of a detailed plan for the study of molecular biology in the USSR, which was formulated in the Government Decree of April 19, 1974 (adopted after the death of A. N. Belozersky) "On measures to accelerate the development of molecular biology and molecular genetics and the use of their achievements in the national economy."

Personal life 
Andrey Nikolaevich was married twice and had three children: daughter Natalia from his first marriage and two children from his second marriage — Mikhail and Tatiana. The children were educated in areas close to biology.

A. N. Belozersky died in Moscow from stomach cancer on December 31, 1972 and was buried at the Novodevichy Cemetery in Moscow.

Scientific activity and achievements

Nucleic acids investigation 
In the early 30s, A. N. Belozersky was the first in the USSR who began a systematic study of nucleic acids. At that time, two types of nucleic acids were known: thymonucleic (DNA) isolated from calf thymus and "yeast" (RNA) found in yeast and wheat seedlings. The first was called "animal", and the second was called "vegetable". The first significant works performed by A. N. Belozersky relate to the issue of "animal" and "plant" nucleic acids. In 1934 articles of A. R. Kiesel and A. N. Belozersky appeared in the journal "Hoppe-Seyler's Zeitschrift fur physiologishe Chemie'' and then in 1935 in the "Scientific Notes of Moscow State University''. In these articles the presence of thymonucleic acid in plant cells was shown. A. N. Belozersky was the first who isolated and identified thymine first from the seedlings of pea seeds and then from the seeds of other legumes. He isolated the DNA itself from the seeds of horse chestnut. Subsequently, the presence of RNA and DNA was confirmed in linden buds, onion bulbs, wheat germ. The results obtained by Belozersky made it possible to reject the division of nucleic acids into "animal" and "plant" and to affirm the idea of the universal distribution of DNA in both plant and animal cells.

While Belozersky was studying bacteria, he noted the high content of nucleic acids in cells, amounting to 30% of dry weight, unlike higher organisms. A. N. Belozersky concluded that this fact is associated with high rates of reproduction and growth of bacteria. Later, A. N. Belozersky showed that the amount of nucleic acids, especially RNA, is not a constant value for one species and changes with the age of the culture: young bacterial cells  may contain more RNA than old ones. Andrey Nikolaevich pointed out a new aspect (at the same time with T. Caspersson and J. Brachet) - the relationship of the number of nucleic acids with the intensity of protein biosynthesis. These conclusions were made by A. N. Belozersky long before the appearance of the "molecular biology" term associated with the publication in the journal "Nature" by James J. Watson and F. Crick on the establishment of a spatial model of the DNA molecule. Thus, as a result of research from 1939 to 1947, A. N. Belozersky obtained the first information in the world scientific space on the content of nucleic acids in various bacterial species.

In a paper published in 1957 in Russian, and in 1958 in English, A. N. Belozersky and his student A. S. Spirin discovered an inconsistency between the composition of DNA and ribosomal RNA. They noticed with a wide range of DNA changes, the composition of RNA varies little from species to species. At the same time, the composition of proteins also varies greatly from species to species. Soviet scientists have proved that the DNA-RNA-protein biosynthesis scheme requires that all elements be in a certain composite correspondence. This conclusion led to the destruction of the old scheme of this process. F. Crick wrote about the article by Belozersky and Spirin:

“The phase of confusion was started by an article by Belozersky and Spirin in 1958. The data they provided showed that our ideas on a number of important points were too simplistic.”

Soviet scientists discovered that there is a certain part of RNA in the cells, which coincides in composition with DNA and is determined by its structure. Later, they suggested that this part of RNA is a link in the transmission of genetic information from DNA to proteins. Part of the RNA discovered by Belozersky and Spirin turned out to be a rapidly synthesizing form of RNA that transfers genetic information from DNA to ribosomes. Later, this part of the RNA was called messenger RNA (mRNA).The work on the study of the nucleotide composition of DNA and RNA in bacteria was the beginning of numerous studies of the composition of nucleic acids in other organisms. These studies were conducted from 1958 to 1965 in groups of the Moscow State University and the USSR Academy of Sciences, headed by A. N. Belozersky. As a result, the composition of DNA and RNA was studied in many actinomycetes (N. V. Shugaeva), fungi (B. F. Vanyushin), algae (M. V. Pakhomova, G. P. Serenkov), some higher plants (B. F. Vanyushin).A. N. Belozersky actively participated in the creation of modern genosystematics (DNA systematics, DNA taxonomy). Today, this direction is being developed by A. S. Antonov and other students of Belozersky.The scientific activities of the groups headed by A. N. Belozersky include the study of the species functional specificity of adaptive RNAs (G. N. Zaitseva), the study of changes in the amino acid composition of proteins in response to the substitution of nucleotides in DNA (A. S. Antonov), the study of phosphate in the simplest organisms, particular in aspects of its transfer from the environment, transport, accumulation and forms of existence (I. S. Kulaev, M. S. Kritsky)

Antibiotics 
Another object of A. N. Belozersky's research was antibiotics, the study of which he began during World War II. A. N. Belozersky studied the chemical structure of one of the most effective Soviet antibiotics — gramicidin S, first obtained by G. F. Gause and M. G. Brazhnikova. In the first works on this topic, the polypeptide nature of gramicidin was shown and its amino acid composition was determined (A. N. Belozersky, T. S. Paskhina). Furthermore, several substituted gramicidin derivatives were obtained and their activity was studied. These works were carried out in the newly organized laboratory of antibiotics of the A. N. Institute of Biochemistry Bach.

Structure of proteins and their complexes with nucleic acids 
A. N. Belozersky was interested in the question of the existence of complexes between nucleic acids and proteins (called "nucleoproteins") in vivo systems. He made an attempt to fractionate nucleoprotein samples and thus developed a methodological scheme of this process, which later played a major role in the study of nucleic acids. Based on his experiments, Belozersky concluded that nucleic acids in cells exist in various complexes with proteins: unbound, labile bound and firmly bound.

It was assumed by F. Mischer and A. Kossel that the protein component of nucleoproteins is histone, a protein that doesn't contain tryptophan. The research of A. N. Belozersky in 1936-1942 for the first time established the presence of tryptophan-containing proteins in the nucleoproteins of plants and animals. Also, A. N. Belozersky and G. I. Abelev isolated histones from wheat germ deoxyribonucleoprotein. This was another proof of the unity of the principles of the organization of the nuclear apparatus in plants and animals.

Other areas of research 
The study of the DNA nucleotide composition in different organisms led to another direction — the study of methylated purine and pyrimidine bases in DNA. These studies were carried out by a student of A. N. Belozersky, B. F. Vanyushin.

A. N. Belozersky made a great contribution to the research of inorganic polyphosphates and teichoic acids. At the Department of Plant Biochemistry, V. B. Korchagin (1954) and I. S. Kulaev (1957) wrote the first PhD dissertations on polyphosphates. Naumova I. B. (1903-2003), a graduate of the Department of Plant Biochemistry, studied the structure and functions of teichoic acids.

During his years at the N. F. Gamalei Institute of Epidemiology and Microbiology of the USSR Academy of Medical Sciences, A. N. Belozersky conducted studies of antigenic and immunogenic properties of E. coli nucleoproteins. Under his leadership, studies of polysaccharides were initiated in different groups of microorganisms: algae, azobacteria, actinomycetes. A wide variety of chemical structure of cell wall polysaccharides was found.

Awards and scientific recognition 
A. N. Belozersky was elected a corresponding member in 1958 and in 1962 - a full member of the USSR Academy of Sciences for his great contribution to science. He was awarded the title of Hero of Socialist Labor (1969), three Orders of Lenin (1961, 1965, 1969) and the Order of the Red Banner of Labor (1951). Belozersky was also awarded the medal "For Valiant Labor in the Great Patriotic War of 1941-1945" and the medal "For the Defense of Moscow" (1945).

In 1948, the Scientific Council of Moscow State University awarded Andrey Nikolaevich the first M. V. Lomonosov Prize for his work "Bacterial nucleoproteins and polynucleotides".

In 1971, A. N. Belozersky was elected a member of the German Academy of Natural Scientists "Leopoldina" in the German Democratic Republic.

A.N. Belozersky name was assigned to the Research Institute of Physico-Chemical Biology of the Lomonosov Moscow State University.

References

1905 births
1972 deaths
Full Members of the USSR Academy of Sciences
Academic staff of Moscow State University
Heroes of Socialist Labour
Soviet biophysicists
Soviet biologists

Burials at Novodevichy Cemetery